The Hail Flutie game, also known as the Miracle in Miami, is a college football game in 1984 that took place between the Boston College Eagles and the Miami Hurricanes on November 23. It has been regarded by FOX Sports writer Kevin Hench as among the most memorable moments in sports.

The game is remembered for its last-second Hail Mary pass from quarterback Doug Flutie to wide receiver Gerard Phelan to give Boston College the win.

At the time, both teams were Independents. Miami was the defending national champion and entered the game with an 8–3 record, ranked twelfth in the nation. Boston College was ranked tenth with a record of 7–2 and had already accepted an invitation to the Cotton Bowl on New Year's Day. The game was played at the Orange Bowl in Miami, and televised nationally by CBS, with Brent Musburger, Ara Parseghian, and Pat Haden commentating.

Records and achievements of the game included:
The Hurricanes' quarterback Bernie Kosar passed for a school-record 447 yards, with two touchdowns.
Miami running back Melvin Bratton ran for four touchdowns.
Flutie passed for 472 yards and three touchdowns to become the first major college quarterback to surpass 10,000 yards passing in a career.
Phelan caught 11 passes for 226 yards and two touchdowns.

The game
Played on Friday, the day after Thanksgiving, it kicked off shortly after 2:30 p.m. EST; Miami was favored by six points.

Boston College jumped out to an early 14–0 lead in the first quarter before quarterback Bernie Kosar and Miami stormed back to tie. The two quarterbacks played phenomenal games, combining for 59–84, 919 yards, and five touchdown passes. At the end of three quarters, the game was tied at 31, and the fourth quarter had multiple lead changes. With 28 seconds left, Boston College trailed 45–41. Three quick plays gained 32 yards, taking the Eagles from their own 20-yard line to the Hurricanes' 48-yard line.

With six seconds on the game clock, Flutie called the "55 Flood Tip" play, which the receivers run straight routes into the end zone, then tip the football to another receiver. Flutie scrambled to his right, narrowly averting a sack. He threw the football from his own 37, requiring the  quarterback to throw the ball at least 63 yards against  winds, after having already thrown the football 45 times during the game.

The Miami defensive backs doubted his ability to throw the ball into the end zone, and paid no attention to Phelan as he ran behind them. The ball came straight down over the mass of players untouched into Phelan's arms for the 47–45 win.

Scoring
First quarter
Boston College – Kelvin Martin 33-yard pass from Doug Flutie (Kevin Snow kick)
Boston College – Ken Bell 5-yard run (Snow kick)
Miami – Melvin Bratton 2-yard run (Greg Cox kick)
Second quarter
Miami – Willie Smith 10-yard pass from Bernie Kosar (Cox kick)
Boston College – Flutie 9-yard run (Snow kick)
Miami – Warren Williams 8-yard pass from Kosar (Cox kick)
Boston College – Gerard Phelan 10-yard pass from Flutie (Snow kick)
Third quarter
Miami – Bratton 2-yard run (Cox kick)
Miami – Cox 19-yard field goal
Boston College – Snow 28-yard field goal
Fourth quarter
Boston College – Snow 19-yard field goal
Miami – Bratton 52-yard run (Cox kick)
Boston College – Steve Strachan 1-yard run (Snow kick)
Miami – Bratton 1-yard run (Cox kick)
Boston College – Phelan 48-yard pass from Flutie (no conversion attempted)

Statistics
{| class=wikitable style="text-align:center"
! Statistics !! BostonCollege   !! Miami
|-
|align=left|First Downs	||30||32
|-
|align=left|Rushes–Yards||34–155||33–208
|-
|align=left|Passing Yards||472||447
|-
|align=left|Passing	||34–46–0||25–38–2
|-
|align=left|Total Offense||80–627||71–655
|-
|align=left|Return Yards||88||128
|-
|align=left|Punts–Average||3–32||1–45
|-
|align=left|Fumbles–Lost ||2–1	||5–1
|-
|align=left|Turnovers||1||3
|-
|align=left|Penalties–Yards||7–50||8–55
|-
|align=left|Time of possession||32:44||27:16
|}

Legacy
Flutie won the Heisman Trophy shortly afterward, the first quarterback chosen in 13 years. He later said, "Without the Hail Mary pass, I think I could have been very easily forgotten. We would have gone to the same bowl game, the Heisman voting was already in, and the direction [of his career], everything would have been the same, except that pass put this label on me as 'It's never over 'til it's over' guy."

A statue of Flutie was placed outside of Alumni Stadium memorializing the play, and featuring the radio call on the side facing the stadium. 

The game was placed in NCAA Football video games as a "College Classic," challenging players to recreate the ending. The scenario begins with the final play, forcing players to attempt the winning throw.

Some claimed that a great increase in applications to Boston College the year after this game was a result of this game. This has been called the Flutie Effect and has been used to describe other colleges that have received an increase in applications and exposure after the success of a college athletics team.

Boston College went on to win the Cotton Bowl; through , it remains the program's most recent appearance in a major bowl game.

Quotes from the play
CBS TV announcer Brent Musburger:

Boston College radio announcer Dan Davis:

...(OH, HE GOT IT!)... (HE GOT IT!) was said by the statistician Dick Tarpey.

See also
 List of historically significant college football games

References

External links
YouTube – Doug Flutie's Miracle pass – CBS Sports

1984 NCAA Division I-A football season
Boston College Eagles football games
Miami Hurricanes football games
American football incidents
November 1984 sports events in the United States
1984 in sports in Florida
1980s in Miami
1984 NCAA Division I-A independents football season